Warwick is a local government district of central Warwickshire in England. It borders the Borough of Rugby and Stratford-on-Avon District in Warwickshire as well as the West Midlands County (of which Coventry and Solihull are within the historic boundaries of Warwickshire). The City of Coventry is to the north and northeast, the Stratford-on-Avon District to the southwest and south, the Borough of Rugby to the east, and the Borough of Solihull to the west and northwest.

The district is centred around a conurbation that includes the towns of Warwick, Leamington Spa and Whitnash which had a population of 95,000. The district also includes the town of Kenilworth and the surrounding rural areas. In February 2021 it was announced that both Warwick District councillors and their Stratford counterparts had "agreed the next steps towards closer working between both District Councils, which could see a recommendation to Government for a merger of the two councils in July 2024." However in April 2022 the merger was scrapped, with Councillor Day (Warwick Leader) accusing Councillor Jefferson (Stratford Leader) of writing to Central Government behind his back, asking for more time for the merger to take place.

History

The district was created on 1 April 1974 under the Local Government Act 1972, by a merger of the former Leamington Spa and Warwick municipal boroughs, the Kenilworth urban district and the Warwick Rural District.

Politics

The current leader of the district council is Conservative Party member Andrew Day. The council is currently in no overall control, but the Conservatives run the administration through an agreement with the Whitnash Residents Association. Conservatives have 19 councillors, the Liberal Democrats have 9 councillors, the Green Party 8 councillors, Labour 5 Councillors with the remaining 3 councillors are part of the Whitnash Residents Association.
The district council headquarters are in Leamington Spa.  It employs more than 500 people in a four-storey building close to the River Leam. The district council deals with issues such as waste management, the collection of council tax, planning/building regulations, council housing and council house repairs. In April 2016 the council announced its plans to move their headquarters nearer the town centre,  however in February 2019 plans were put on hold, and as of July 2021 no decision had been made and is unlikely due to the probable merger with Stratford District.

The political makeup of Warwick District Council following the 2019 local elections is as follows:

In August 2020 Warwickshire County Council put forward proposals for the five district and borough councils in the county to be abolished and replaced with a single county-wide unitary authority. This prompted a backlash from the district and borough councils who commissioned their own report, which argued in favour of Warwickshire being split into two unitary authorities, one for the north of the county, covering the current districts of North Warwickshire, Nuneaton and Bedworth and Rugby, and one for the south of the county, covering Warwick and Stratford districts. In September 2020, it was agreed that both proposals would be sent for consideration to the Secretary of State for Housing, Communities and Local Government. In February 2021 it was announced that both Warwick District councillors and their Stratford counterparts had "agreed the next steps towards closer working between both District Councils, which could see a recommendation to Government for a merger of the two councils in July 2024." The joint council is expected to be called South Warwickshire District Council and as such early summer 2021 saw a South Warwickshire Local Plan to replace the two existing plans. However in April 2022 the merger was scrapped, with Councillor Day (Warwick Leader) accusing Councillor Jefferson (Stratford Leader) of writing to Central Government behind his back asking for more time for the merge to take place.

The Environment

On 27 June 2019 the elected members at the Full Council meeting declared a "climate emergency" in response to ongoing global climate change. The council aims to become carbon neutral by 2025, whilst trying to make the whole district carbon neutral by 2030. On 20 January 2020 it was announced that electric cars would be given free parking in council car parks. On 4 February of that year it was proposed by the Council group leaders to increase council tax by around £1 a week on Band D properties to create £3 million per year. This would be ring-fenced for environmental purposes. If this proposal was accepted by the other councillors then a district wide referendum would have been held on 7 May to decide if the public accept it. On 26 February the full council unanimously agreed the proposal, triggering the 7 May referendum, - which was put back to 6 May 2021, due to the 2020 COVID-19 pandemic. As of April 2022 the referendum has not yet occurred and no date has been set.

Demography

Travel, Education & Healthcare
The district has six railway stations – Warwick, Warwick Parkway, Leamington Spa, Kenilworth, Hatton and Lapworth. Regular bus services run between Warwick, Leamington and Kenilworth and onwards to Coventry, Stratford upon Avon and the University of Warwick. The Grand Union Canal flows through the district and the M40 motorway also passes through. Right on the edge of the district is Coventry Airport.

National Health Service general healthcare is provided by South Warwickshire NHS Foundation Trust and mental health care by Coventry and Warwickshire Partnership NHS Trust. Local hospitals include Warwick Hospital, the Leamington Spa Hospital, St Michael's Hospital and the Warwickshire Nuffield Hospital (non-NHS, part of the Nuffield Health group) Social services is pro On 13 July 2021 a coronavirus "mega lab" was opened in the town. Named after English chemist Rosalind Franklin. The site is expected to be capable of processing "hundreds of thousands of samples a day". The largest laboratory of its kind in the UK, and it is hoped it will create up to 1,500 jobs. It will also play a "key role in responding to new variants of the virus". Historic hospitals included St Michael's Leper Hospital, Warneford Hospital and Central Hospital. Social services and fostering are dealt with on a countywide basis by Warwickshire County Council.

Freedom of district
 MoD Kineton: 4 April 2013.
 On 26 November 2013 the freedom of the district was bestowed on the Royal Regiment of Fusiliers following a parade through Royal Leamington Spa.

Parishes and settlements
The Warwick district includes the settlements and Parishes of:

Ashow
Baddesley Clinton, Baginton, Barford, Beausale, Bishops Tachbrook, Blackdown, Bubbenhall, Budbrooke, Bushwood
Chadwick End (part), Cubbington
Eathorpe
Haseley, Hatton, Honiley, Hunningham
Kenilworth
Lapworth, Lillington, Leamington Spa, Leek Wootton
Norton Lindsey
Offchurch, Old Milverton
Radford Semele, Rowington
Sherbourne, Shrewley, Stoneleigh
Wappenbury, Warwick, Wasperton, Weston Under Wetherley, Whitnash, Wroxall

Electoral wards
This is a guide to the size of the wards in Warwick District based on the data from the 2001 UK Census. The entire population of the district was 125,929.

N.B. Ward populations will differ from the village population which they are named after and which they are linked to as ward boundaries very rarely match village boundaries exactly. The Warwick (Electoral Changes) Order 2014 redrew the electoral boundaries in 2014, abolishing many of those outlined above.

References

External links
www.warwickdc.gov.uk, Warwick District Council.

 
Non-metropolitan districts of Warwickshire